Willem Hendrik Ouwehand (born August 1953) is professor of experimental haematology at the School of Clinical Medicine, University of Cambridge. He is a Fellow of the Academy of Medical Sciences and a Senior Investigator at the National Institute for Health and Care Research (NIHR).. He has cultivated many excellent scientist who are considered to belong the Academic House of Ouwehand. This spans across the globe.

References

External links
 Willem Ouwehand talking about genomics.

Dutch hematologists
1953 births
NIHR Senior Investigators
Academics of the University of Cambridge
Dutch emigrants to the United Kingdom
Living people

Fellows of the Academy of Medical Sciences (United Kingdom)